Richard Hobart FitzGibbon, 3rd Earl of Clare (2 October 1793 – 10 January 1864) was an Anglo-Irish politician and noble.

Born at Mountshannon House in County Limerick, FitzGibbon was educated at Harrow School.  He joined the British Army, and was present at the Battle of Oporto and Battle of Talavera.

At the 1818 UK general election, he stood in Limerick County for the Whigs, winning the seat.  He rarely spoke in Parliament, and did not always vote in line with the Whig leadership.  In turn, they offered him little support, but he nevertheless held his seat, sometimes describing himself as an independent.  He served until 1841, when he stood down. He was appointed Governor of Limerick in 1818, and later served twice as Lord Lieutenant of Limerick.

In the 1820s, FitzGibbon has a child with Diana Woodcock, who was then married to Maurice Crosbie Moore.  He obtained a divorce in 1825, by act of the House of Lords, and FitzGibbon and Woodcock immediately married.  However, Moore secured custody of FitzGibbon's illegitimate child, despite stating that he was doing so purely out of vindictiveness.  The couple had one legitimate child, John Charles Henry FitzGibbon, who was killed in the Battle of Balaklava in 1854.  In 1851, FitzGibbon succeeded his brother as the Earl of Clare.  He died in 1864.

References

1793 births
1864 deaths
19th-century Anglo-Irish people
FitzGibbon, Richard
British Army officers
[[Lord-Lieutenants of Limerick]]
Members of the Parliament of the United Kingdom for County Limerick constituencies (1801–1922)
People educated at Harrow School
People from County Limerick
UK MPs 1818–1820
UK MPs 1820–1826
UK MPs 1826–1830
UK MPs 1830–1831
UK MPs 1831–1832
UK MPs 1832–1835
UK MPs 1835–1837
UK MPs 1837–1841
Whig (British political party) MPs for Irish constituencies